This is a list of state leaders in the 17th century (1601–1700) AD, except for the leaders within the Holy Roman Empire, and the leaders within South Asia.

These polities are generally sovereign states, but excludes minor dependent territories, whose leaders can be found listed under territorial governors in the 17th century. For completeness, these lists can include colonies, protectorates, or other dependent territories that have since gained sovereignty.

Africa

Africa: Central

Angola

Kasanje Kingdom (complete list) –
Kalanda ka Imbe, King (c.1600s)
Kulashingo, King (c.1610–1616)
Kasanje ka Kulashingo, King (c.1616–1620s)
Kalunga ka Kilombo, King (c.1630s–1650)
Ngongo a Mbande, King (c.1650–1680)
Dom. Pascoal Machado, King (1680)
Kingwangwa kya Kima, King (c.1680–1681)
Kitamba kya Keta, King (1681–1690)
Mwanya a Kasanje, King (c.1690s)
Kiluanje kya Ngonga, King (c.1690s–1700s)

Kingdom of Kongo (complete list) –
Kwilu dynasty
Álvaro II, Manikongo (1587–1614)
Bernardo II, Manikongo (1614–1615)
Álvaro III, Manikongo (1615–1622)
Kinkanga dynasty
Pedro II, Manikongo (1622–1624)
Garcia I, Manikongo (1624–1626)
Kwilu dynasty
Ambrósio I, Manikongo (1626–1631)
Álvaro IV, Manikongo (1631–1636)
Kimpanzu dynasty
Álvaro V, Manikongo (1636)
Kinlaza dynasty
Álvaro VI, Manikongo (1636–1641)
Garcia II, Manikongo (1641–1660)
António I, Manikongo (1660–1665)
Civil War: Awenekongo
Afonso II, Manikongo (1665)
Álvaro VII, Manikongo (1665–1666)
Álvaro VIII, Manikongo (1666–1669)
Pedro III, Manikongo (1669)
Álvaro IX, Manikongo (1669–1670)
Rafael I, Manikongo (1670–1673)
Afonso III, Manikongo (1673–1674)
Daniel I, Manikongo (1674–1678)

Kongo claimants of Kibangu (complete list) –
Garcia III of Kibangu, Awenekongo (1669–1685)
André I of Kibangu, Awenekongo (1685)
Manuel I of Kibangu, Awenekongo (1685–1688)
Álvaro X of Kibangu, Awenekongo (1688–1695)
Pedro IV, Awenekongo (1695–1709)

Kongo claimants of Lemba (complete list) –
Pedro III, Awenekongo (1669–1680)
João II of Lemba, Awenekongo (1680–1716)

Kongo claimants of Mbamba Lovata (complete list) –
Manuel of Lovata, Awenekongo (1678–1715)

Kingdom of Matamba (complete list) –
Mwongo Matamba, Queen (?–1631)
Nzinga Mbande, Queen (1631–1663)
Barbara, Queen (1663–1666)
Njinga Mona, King (1666–1669)
João, King (1669–1670)
Njinga Mona, King (1670–1680)
Francisco I, King (1680–1681)
Verónica I, Queen (1681–1721)

Portuguese Angola,  (complete list) –
Colony, 1575–1951
For details see the Kingdom of Portugal under Southwest Europe

Cameroon

Fondom of Bafut (complete list) –
Feurlu, King (1516–1552)
Nebasi Suh, King (1552–1570)
Ambebi Ferh, King (1570–1635)
Nebanfor, King (1635–1677)
Chunga, King (1677–1708)

Kingdom of Bamum (complete list) –
Ngapna, Mfon (1590–1629)
Ngouloure, Mfon (1629–1672)
Koutou, Mfon (1672–1757)

Chad

Sultanate of Bagirmi (complete list) –
‘Abdallah, Mbangi (1568–1608)
‘Umar (1608–1625)
Dalai, Mbangi (1625–1635)
Burkomanda I, Mbangi (1635–1665)
‘Abdul Rahman I, Mbangi (1665–1674)
Dalo Birni, Mbangi (1674–1680)
‘Abdul Qadir I, Mbangi (1680–1707)

Congo, Democratic Republic of the

Kuba Kingdom (complete list) –
Shamba Bolongongo, Nyim (c.1600)
Bongo Lenge, Nyim (17th century)
Golo Bosh, Nyim (17th century)
Boni Bosh, Nyim (17th century)
Kongo Kama Bomanchala, Nyim (17th century)
Bo Kama Bomanchala, Nyim (c.1680)
Golo Boke, Nyim (late 17th century)
Bokere Boke, Nyim (late 17th century)
KotomBoke, Nyim (17th or 18th century)

Kingdom of Lunda (complete list) –
Cibind Yirung, Mwaantaangaand (c.1600–c.1630)
Yaav I a Yirung, Mwaantaangaand (c.1630–c.1660)
Yaav II a Nawej, Mwaantaangaand (c.1660–c.1690)
Mbala I Yaav, Mwaant Yaav (c.1690–c.1720)

Congo, Republic of the

Kingdom of Loango (complete list) –
Moe Poaty I Kamangou, King (16th or 17th century)
Ngouli N'Kama Loembe, King (17th century)
N'Gangue M'voumbe Niambi, King (late 17th century)

Gabon

Kingdom of Orungu (complete list) –
Reto Ndongo, Founder (c.1700–?)

São Tomé and Príncipe

Portuguese São Tomé and Príncipe (complete list) –
Colony, 1470–1951
For details see the Kingdom of Portugal under Southwest Europe

Africa: East

Great Lakes area

Burundi

Kingdom of Burundi (complete list) –
Ntare I Rushatsi Cambarantama, King (c.1530–c.1550)
Mwezi I Baridamunka, King (c.1550–c.1580)
Mutaga I Mutabazi, King (c.1580–c.1600)
Mwambutsa I Nkomati, King (c.1600–c.1620)
Ntare II Kibogora, King (c.1620–c.1650)
Mwezi II Nyaburunga, King (c.1650–c.1680)
Ntare I, King (c.1680–c.1709)

Kenya

Sultanate of Mombasa (complete list) –
Yusuf ibn al-Hasan (1614–1632)

Pate Sultanate: Nabahani dynasty (complete list) –
Bwana Mkuu, Mfalume (1688–1713)

Rwanda

Kingdom of Rwanda (complete list) – 
Kigeli II Nyamuheshera, King (1576–1609)
Mibamwe II Sekarongoro II Gisanura, King (1609–1642)
Yuhi III Mazimpaka, King (1642–1675)
Cyilima II Rujugira, King (1675–1708)

South Sudan

Shilluk Kingdom –
Odaagø Ocøllø, Rädh (c.1600–1635)
Dhokoth, Rädh (c.1670–1690)
Tugø, Rädh (c.1690–1710)

Uganda

Buganda (complete list) –
Suuna I, Kabaka (c.1584–c.1614)
Sekamaanya, Kabaka (c.1614–c.1634)
Kimbugwe, Kabaka (c.1634–c.1644)
Kateregga, Kabaka (c.1644–c.1674)
Mutebi I, Kabaka (c.1674–c.1680)
Juuko, Kabaka (c.1680–c.1690)
Kayemba, Kabaka (c.1690–c.1704)

Bunyoro (complete list) –
Cwamali, Omukama 
Masamba, Omukama 
Anabwani I, Omukama (late 17th century)
Kyebambe I, Omukama 
Winyi III, Omukama 
Nyaika, Omukama

Horn of Africa area

Ethiopia

Ethiopian Empire: Solomonic dynasty (complete list) –
Za Dengel, Emperor (1603–1604)
Yaqob, Emperor (1597–1603, 1604–1606)
Susenyos I, Emperor (1606–1632)
Fasilides, Emperor (1632–1667)
Yohannes I, Emperor (1667–1682)
Iyasu I, Emperor (1682–1706)

Ennarea (complete list) –
Badancho, Hinnare-tato (c.1580–1603)
Benero, Hinnare-tato (c.1605–1619)
Sysgayo, Hinnare-tato (c.1619–1630)
Emana Krestos, Hinnare-tato (c.1630–1640)
Gumičo, Hinnare-tato (c.1650–1645)
Techochi, Hinnare-tato (mid 17th century)
Gaha Nechocho, Hinnare-tato (mid 17th century)
Gawa Sherocho, Hinnare-tato (late 17th century)

Kingdom of Garo (complete list) –
Ambiraj, Tato (1567–1600)
Magela, Tato (1600–1630)
Daro, Tato (1630–1660)
Chowaka, Tato (1660–1690)
Leliso, Tato (1690–1720)

Emirate of Harar (complete list) –
ʿAli ibn Dā'ūd, Emīr (1647–1662)
Hāshim ibn ʿAli, Emīr (1662–1671)
ʿAbdullah ibn ʿAli, Emīr (1671–1700)
Ṭalḥa ibn ʿAbdullah, Emīr (1700–1721)

Kingdom of Kaffa (complete list) –
Bong-he or Borrete or Bongatato, King (1565–1605)
Giba Nekiok or Bonge or Galo Nechocho, King (1605–1640)
Gali Gafocho or Gali Ginok, King (1640–1675)
Gali Ginocho or Tan Ginok, King (1675–1710)

Kingdom of Welayta: Tigre dynasty (complete list) –
Gazenja, Kawa (17th century)
Gazenya
Addayo, Kawa (17th century)

Somalia

Sultanate of the Geledi (complete list) –
Ibrahim Adeer, Sultan (late 17th century–mid 18th century)

Warsangali Sultanate –
Garaad Abdale, Sultan (1585–1612)
Garaad Ali, Sultan (1612–1655)
Garaad Mohamud IV, Sultan (1655–1675)
Garaad Naleye, Sultan (1675–1705)

Indian Ocean

Comoros

Sultanate of Ndzuwani (complete list) –
Alimah III, Sultan/female ruler (c.1676–c.1711)

Madagascar

Merina Kingdom (complete list) –
Ralambo, King (1575–1612)
Andrianjaka, King (1612–1630)
Andriantsitakatrandriana, King (1630–1650)
Andriantsimitoviaminandriandehibe, King (1650–1670)
Andrianjaka Razakatsitakatrandriana, King (1670–1675)
Andriamasinavalona, King (1675–1710)

Boina Kingdom (complete list) –
Andriamandisoarivo (Tsimanata), King (c.1690–1720)

Africa: Northcentral

Tunisia

Eyalet of Tunis: Muradid dynasty –
Murad I, Bey (1613–1631)
Hammuda Pasha, Bey (1631–1666)
Murad II, Bey (1666–1675)
Mohamed El Mouradi, Bey (1686–1696)

Africa: Northeast

Egypt

Sudan

Sultanate of Darfur (complete list) –
Sulayman Solong, Sultan (c.1660–c.1680)
Musa Sulayman, Sultan (c.1680–?)

Funj Sultanate (complete list) –
Unsa I, Sultan (1591–1603/4)
Abd al-Qadir II, Sultan (1603/4–1606)
Adlan I, Sultan (1606–1611/2)
Badi I, Sultan (1611/2–1616/7)
Rabat I, Sultan (1616/7–1644/5)
Badi II, Sultan (1644/5–1681)
Unsa II, Sultan (1681–1692)
Badi III, Sultan (1692–1716)

Africa: Northwest

Algeria

Regency of Algiers (Sultans / Governors) –
Vassal state, 1671–1830
Ismail, Pasha (1659–1686)
Mezzo Morto Hüseyin, Pasha (1686–1687)
Mustapha V, Pasha (1694)
Umar Pasha, Pasha (1694–1695)
Musa, Pasha (1695–1698)
Umar Pasha, Pasha (1698–1700)
Pashas without power, 1700–1711

Morocco

Saadi dynasty of Morocco (complete list) –
Ahmad al-Mansur, Sultan (1578–1603)
Succession war: 1603–1627
Abu Faris Abdallah, Sultan (1603–1608)
Zidan Abu Maali, Sultan (1603–1627)
Abd al-Malik II, Sultan (1627–1631)
Al-Walid ibn Zidan, Sultan (1631–1636)
Mohammed esh-Sheikh es-Seghir, Sultan (1636–1655)
Ahmad al-Abbas, Sultan (1655–1659)

Morocco, Dila'i interlude (complete list) –
Muhammad al-Haj ad-Dila'i, Sultan (1659–1663)

Alaouite dynasty of Morocco (complete list) –
Al-Rashid, Sultan (1666–1672)
Ismail Ibn Sharif, Sultan (1672–1727)

Africa: South

Angola

Kingdom of Ndongo (complete list) –
Mbandi a Ngola, Ngola (1592–1617)
Ngola Mbandi, Ngola (1617–1624)
Nzinga of Ndongo and Matamba, Queen (1624–1626)
under Portuguese vassalage
Hari a Kiluanje, King (1626)
Hari, King (1626–1657)
of Ndongo-Matamba;
Nzinga of Ndongo and Matamba, Queen (1657–1663)
of the state of Pungo a Ndongo;
Mukambu Mbandi, Queen (1663–1671)

Mozambique

Portuguese Mozambique (complete list) –
Colony, 1498–1972
For details see the Kingdom of Portugal under Southwest Europe

South Africa

Dutch Cape Colony (complete list) –
Company rule of the Dutch East India Company, 1652–1795; British occupation, 1795–1803
For details see the Netherlands under western Europe

Zimbabwe

Kingdom of Mutapa (complete list) –
Gatsi Rusere, Mwenemutapa (1589–1623)
Nyambu Kapararidze, Mwenemutapa (1623–1629)
becomes a Portuguese vassal (1629)
Mavura Mhande Felipe, Mwenemutapa (1629–1652)
Siti Kazurukamusapa, Mwenemutapa (1652–1663)
becomes a Rozwi Vassal (1663)
Kamharapasu Mukombwe, Mwenemutapa (1663–1692)
Nyakambira, Mwenemutapa (1692–1694)
returns to Portuguese vassalage (1694)
Nyamaende Mhande, Mwenemutapa (1694–1707)

Rozvi Empire (complete list) –
Changamire Tumbare, King (1530–c.1660)
Changamire Dombo, King (c.1660–1695)
Changamire Zharare, King (c.1695–c.1700)
Changamire Negamo, King (c.1700–1710)

Africa: West

Benin

Kingdom of Benin (complete list) –
Ehengbuda, Oba (1580–1602)
Ohuan, Oba (1602–1656)
Ohenzae, Oba (1656–1661)
Akenzae, Oba (1661–1669)
Akengboi, Oba (1669–1675)
Akenkpaye, Oba (1675–1684)
Akengbedo, Oba (1684–1689)
Ore-Oghene, Oba (1689–1701)

Abomey (complete list) –
Do-Aklin, ruler (c.1600)
Dakodonou, ruler (c.1625–1645)

Hogbonu (complete list) –
Té-Agbanlin, Ahosu (1688–1729)

Burkina Faso

Mossi Kingdom of Nungu (complete list) –
Kampadiboaghi, Nunbado (1571–1615)
Kampadi, Nunbado (1615–1659)
Tantiari, Nunbado (1659–1684)
Lissoangui, Nunbado (1684–1709)

Cape Verde

Portuguese Cape Verde (complete list) –
Colony, 1462–1951
For details see the Kingdom of Portugal under Southwest Europe

Ghana

Kingdom of Ashanti (complete list) –
Osei Kofi Tutu I, Asantehene (c.1675/80–1717)

Denkyira, or Agona (complete list) –
Mumunumfi, Agonahene (1588–1620)
Mumunumfi, Denkyirahene (1620–1624)
Werempe Ampem, Denkyirahene (1624–1637)
Boa Amponsem I, Denkyirahene (1637–1695)
Ntim Gyakari, Denkyirahene (1695–1701)

Guinea-Bissau

Portuguese Guinea (complete list) –
Colony, 1474–1951
For details see the Kingdom of Portugal under Southwest Europe

Mali

Mali Empire: Keita dynasty (complete list) –
Mahmud IV, Mansa (1590s–1600s)

Kénédougou Kingdom –
Nanka Traoré, Faama (c.1650–?)

Niger

Dendi Kingdom: Askiya dynasty (complete list) –
al-Mustafa, Askiya (c.1600)
Muhammad Sorko-ije, Askiya (early 17th century)
Harun Dankataya, Askiya (early 17th century)
al-Amin, Askiya (1611–1618)
Dawud II, Askiya (1618–1639)
Ismail, Askiya (c.1639)
Muhammad, Askiya (1639)
Dawud III, Askiya (1639–?)
Muhammad Borgo, Askiya (early 17th century)
Mar-Chindin, Askiya (early 17th century)
Nuh II, Askiya (early 17th century)
Muhammad Al-Borko, Askiya (early 17th century)
Al-Hajj, Askiya (mid 17th century)
Ismail, Askiya (mid 17th century)
Dawud III, Askiya (c.1655)

Nigeria

Bornu Empire (Kanem–Bornu) (complete list) –
Muhammed VI Bukalmarami, Mai (1596–1612)
Ibrahim III of Bornu, Mai (1612–1619)
Umar, Mai (1619–1639)
Ali II, Mai (1639–1677)
Idris IV of Bornu, Mai (1677–1696)
Dunama VII, Mai (1696–1715)

Oyo Empire (complete list) –
Abipa, Alaafin (c.1600–?)
Obalokun, Alaafin (17th century)
Oluodo, Alaafin (17th century)
Ajagbo, Alaafin (17th century)
Odarawu, Alaafin (17th century)
Kanran, Alaafin (17th century)
Jayin, Alaafin (17th century or 18th century)

Sultanate of Kano (complete list) –
Muhammad Zaki, Sultan (1582–1618)
Muhammad Nazaki, Sultan (1618–1623)
Kutumbi, Sultan (1623–1648)
al-Hajj, Sultan (1648–1649)
Shekarau (emir), Sultan (1649–1651)
Muhammad Kukuna, Sultan (1651–1652, 1652–1660)
Soyaki, Sultan (1652)
Bawa, Sultan (1660–1670)
Dadi, Sultan (1670–1703)

Lagos (complete list) –
Ashipa, Oba (c.1682–1716)

Kingdom of Nri (complete list) –
Eze Nri Agụ, King (1583–1676)
Eze Nri Apia and Nri–Alike, King (1677–1700)

Senegal

Cayor (complete list) –
Lat Sukabe, Damel (1697–1719)

Kingdom of Jolof (complete list) –
Gireun Buri Dyelen, Buur-ba (1597–1605)
Birayma Penda, Buur-ba (1605–1649)
Birayma Mba, Buur-ba (1649–1670)
Bakar Penda, Buur-ba (1670–1711)

Waalo (complete list) –
Naatago Aram Bakar, King (1674–1708)

Sierra Leone

Kingdom of Koya (complete list) –
Naimbanna I, Bai (1680–1720)

Americas

Americas: Caribbean

Antigua

Colonial Antigua (complete list) –
British colony, 1632–1981
For details see the United Kingdom under British Isles, Europe

The Bahamas

Colony of the Bahamas (complete list) –
British colony, 1648–1973
For details see the United Kingdom under British Isles, Europe

Barbados

Colonial Barbados (complete list) –
British colony, 1625–1966
For details see the United Kingdom under British Isles, Europe

Cuba

Captaincy General of Cuba (complete list) –
Spanish Colony, 1607–1898
For details see Spain in southwest Europe

Haiti

Saint-Domingue (complete list) –
French Colony, 1625–1804
For details see France in western Europe

Netherlands

Curaçao and Dependencies (complete list) –
Dutch colony  1634–1828, 1845–1954
For details see the Netherlands under western Europe

Americas: Central

Guatemala

Captaincy General of Guatemala (complete list) –
Spanish Colony, 1609–1821
For details see Spain in southwest Europe

Nicaragua

Miskito Coast (complete list) –
Oldman, King (c.1650–c.1687)
Jeremy I, King (c.1687–1718)

Americas: North

Canada

Canada (New France)  (complete list) –
French colony, 1535–1763
For details see France under western Europe

Newfoundland Colony (complete list) –
British colony, 1610–1907
For details see the United Kingdom under British Isles, Europe

Mexico

Viceroyalty of New Spain (complete list) –
Spanish Colony, 1521–1821
For details see Spain in southwest Europe

Americas: South

Brazil

Colonial Brazil (complete list) –
Portuguese colony, 1500/1534–1808
For details see the Kingdom of Portugal under Southwest Europe

Chile

Captaincy General of Chile (complete list) –
Spanish Colony, 1541–1818
For details see Spain in southwest Europe

Peru

Viceroyalty of Peru (complete list) –
Spanish Colony, 1542–1824
For details see Spain in southwest Europe

Suriname

English Surinam (complete list) –
English/ British colony, 1650–1667
For details see the United Kingdom under British Isles, Europe

Dutch Surinam (complete list) –
Dutch colony 1667–1954
For details see the Netherlands under western Europe

Asia

Asia: Central

Kazakhstan

Dzungar Khanate (complete list) –
Khara Khula, Khong Tayiji (early 1600s–1634)
Erdeni Batur, Khong Tayiji (1634–1653)
Sengge, Khong Tayiji (1653–1670)
Galdan Boshugtu, Khong Tayiji (1670–1697)
Tsewang Arabtan, Khong Tayiji (1694–1727)

Kazakh Khanate (complete list) –
Esim, Khan (1598–1628)
Zhangir, Khan (1628–1652)
Batyr, Khan (1652–1680)
Tauke, Khan (1680–1718)

Mongolia

Altan Khan of the Khalkha (complete list) –
Ubasi Khong Tayiji, Khan (?–1623)
Badma Erdeni Khong Tayiji, Khan (1623–?)
Erinchin Lobsang Tayiji, Khan (c.1658–c.1691)

Tajikistan

Yarkent Khanate, Western Moghulistan (complete list) –
Muhammad, Khan (1591–1610)
Shudja ad-Din Ahmad, Khan (1610–1618)
Kuraysh, Khan (1618)
Abd al-Latif, Khan (1618–1630)
Ahmad, Khan (1630–1633)
Mahmud, Khan (1633–1636)
Ahmad, Khan (1636–1638)
Abdullah, Khan (1638–1669)
Nur ad-Din, Khan (1667–1668)
Ismail, Khan (1669–1670)
YuIbars, Khan (1669–1670)
Abd al Latif, Khan (1670)
Ismail, Khan (1670–1680)
Abd ar-Rashid II, Khan (1680–1682)
Muhammad Amin, Khan (1682–1692)
Abakh Khoja, Khan (1692–1694)
Yahiya Khoja, Khan (1694–1695)
Hanim Padsha, Khatun (1695)
Akbash, Khan (1695–1705)

Tibet

Guge
Khri Grags pa'i dBang phyug, King (c.1600)
Khri Nam rgyal Grags pa lde, King (fl. 1618)
Khri bKra shis Grags pa lde, King (pre-1622–1630)

Phagmodrupa dynasty (complete list) –
Ngawang Drakpa Gyaltsen, Monarch (1576–1603/1604)
Mipham Wanggyur Gyalpo, Monarch (1604–1613)
Mipham Sonam Wangchuk Drakpa Namgyal Palzang, Monarch (early 17th century)

Tsangpa (complete list) –
Khunpang Lhawang Dorje, Monarch (c.1582–1605/1606)
Karma Thutob Namgyal, Monarch (c.1586–1610)
Karma Tensung, Monarch (1599–1611)
Karma Phuntsok Namgyal, Monarch (1611–1620)
Karma Tenkyong, Monarch (1620–1642)

Khoshut Khanate of Tibet
Khans (complete list) –
Güshi, Khan (1642–1655)
Dayan, Khan (1655–1668)
Tenzin Dalai, Khan (1668–1696)
Tenzin Wangchuk, Khan (1696–1697)
Lha-bzang, Khan (1697–1717)
Dalai Lamas (complete list) –
Ngawang Lobsang Gyatso, 5th Dalai Lama (1642–1682)
Tsangyang Gyatso, 6th Dalai Lama (1697–1706)

Uzbekistan

Khanate of Bukhara –
Baqi Muhammad, Khan (1599–1605)
Vali Muhammad, Khan (1605–1611)
Imam Quli, Khan (1611–1642)
Nadr Muhammad, Khan (1642–1645)
Abdu'l-Aziz, Khan (1645–1680)
Subhan Quli, Khan (1680–1702)

Khanate of Khiva (complete list) –
Haji Muhammad I, Khan (1558–1602)
Arab Muhammad I, Khan (1602–1623)
Isfandiyar, Khan (1623–1643)
Abu al-Ghazi Bahadur, Khan (1643–1663)
Anusha, Khan (1663–1685)
unnamed, Khan (1685–1714)
Khudaydad, Khan (1685–1687)
Muhammad Awrang I, Khan (1687–1694)
Chuchaq, Khan (1694–1697)
Vali, Khan (1697–1698)
Ishaq Agha Shah Niyaz, Khan (1698–1701)

Kalmyk Khanate (complete list) –
Kho Orluk, Khan (1633–1644)
Shukhur Daichin, Khan (1644–1661)
Puntsug, Khan (1661–1672)
Ayuka, Khan (1672–1723)

Asia: East

China

Ming dynasty (complete list) –
Wanli, Emperor (1572–1620)
Taichang, Emperor (1620)
Tianqi, Emperor (1620–1627)
Chongzhen, Emperor (1627–1644)

Southern Ming (complete list) –
Zhu Yousong, Emperor (1644–1645)
Zhu Yujian, Emperor (1645–1646)
Zhu Yihai, Regent / Emperor (1645–1655)
Zhu Yuyue, Emperor (1646–1647)
Zhu Youlang, ruler (1646–1647)
Zhu Changqing, ruler (1648–1649)

Shun dynasty –
Li Zicheng, Emperor (1643–1645)

Qing dynasty (complete list) –
Nurhaci, Khan (1616–1626)
Hong Taiji, Khan (1626–1636), Emperor (1636–1643)
Shunzhi, Emperor (1643–1661)
Kangxi, Emperor (1661–1722)

China: Taiwan

Dutch Formosa (complete list) –
Dutch colony 1624–1668
For details see the Netherlands under western Europe

Kingdom of Middag –
Kamachat Aslamie, King, (?–1648)
Kamachat Maloe, King, (1648–?)

Spanish Formosa (complete list) –
Spanish Colony, 1626–1642
For details see Spain in southwest Europe

Japan

Tokugawa shogunate of Japan
Emperors (complete list) –
Go-Yōzei, Emperor (1586–1611)
Go-Mizunoo, Emperor (1611–1629)
Meishō, Emperor (1629–1643)
Go-Kōmyō, Emperor (1643–1654)
Go-Sai, Emperor (1655–1663)
Reigen, Emperor (1663–1687)
Higashiyama, Emperor (1687–1709)
Shōguns (complete list) –
Tokugawa Ieyasu, Shōgun (1603–1605)
Tokugawa Hidetada, Shōgun (1605–1623)
Tokugawa Iemitsu, Shōgun (1623–1651)
Tokugawa Ietsuna, Shōgun (1641–1680)
Tokugawa Tsunayoshi, Shōgun (1680–1709)

Ryukyu Kingdom: Second Shō dynasty –
Tributary state of the Ming dynasty, 1429–1644
Shō Nei, King (1589–1620)
Vassal state of Satsuma Domain, 1609–1872
Shō Hō, King (1621–1640)
Shō Ken, King (1641–1647)
Shō Shitsu, King (1648–1668)
Shō Tei, King (1669–1709)

Korea

Joseon (complete list) –
Seonjo, King (1567–1608)
Gwanghaegun, King (1608–1623)
Injo, King (1623–1649)
Hyojong, King (1649–1659)
Hyeonjong, King (1659–1674)
Sukjong, King (1674–1720)

Mongolia

Alliance of the Four Oirat (complete list) –
Kharkhul, leader (1606–1634)

Northern Yuan dynasty (complete list) –
Buyan Sechen, Khan (1592–1603)
Ligdan, Khan (1604–1634)
Ejei, Khan (1634–1635)

Asia: Southeast

Brunei

Bruneian Empire (complete list) –
Abdul Jalilul Akbar, Sultan (1598–1659)
Abdul Jalilul Jabbar, Sultan (1659–1660)
Muhammad Ali, Sultan (1660–1661)
Abdul Hakkul Mubin, Sultan (1660–1673)
Muhyiddin, Sultan (1673–1690)
Nassaruddin, Sultan (1690–1710)

Cambodia

Kingdom of Cambodia: Middle Period (complete list) –
Ponhea Nhom, King (1600–1603)
Barom Reachea IV, King (1603–1618)
Chey Chettha II, King (1618–1628)
Outey, King (1628–1642)
Thommoreachea II or Sri Dharmaraja II, King (1628–1630)
Batom Reachea or Padumaraja I, King (1640–1642)
Ramathipadi I, King (1642–1658)
Barom Reachea V or Paramaraja IX, King (1658–1672)
Chey Chettha III or Padumaraja II, King (1672–1673)
Kaev Hua II, King (1673–1674)
Padumaraja III, King (1674)
Chey Chettha IV, King (1675–1695, 1696–1699, 1700–1702, 1703–1706)
Outey I or Narai Ramathipadi II, King (1695–1696)
Barom Ramadhipati or Kaev Hua III, King (1699–1700, 1710–1722)

Indonesia

Indonesia: Java

Banten Sultanate (complete list) –
Pangeran Ratu, Sultan (1596–1651)
Abu’lma’ali Ahmad, Sultan (1638–c.1650)
Ageng Tirtayasa, Sultan (1651–1683)
Abu an-Nasr, Sultan (1682–1687)
Abdul Fadhl, Sultan (1687–1690)
Abdul Mahasin Muhammad Zainulabidin, Sultan (1690–1733)

Sultanate of Cirebon (complete list) –
Panembahan Ratu, Sultan (c.1570–1649)
Panembahan Girilaya, Sultan (c.1650–1662)
Split into the Kraton Kasepuhan, Kraton Kanoman, Kraton Kacirebonan, Panembahan Cirebon lines

Sultanate of Cirebon: Kraton Kacirebonan (complete list) –
Pangeran Arya Cirebon, Kamaruddin, Sultan (1697–1723)

Blambangan Kingdom (complete list) –
Mas Karian, King (?–1632)
Sunan Tawang Alun I, King (1633–1639)
Tawang Alun II, King (1665–1691)
Pangeran Pati, King (1691)
Sasranegara, Co-King (1691–1692)
Mancanapura, King (1691–1697)
Pangeran Putr, King (1697–1736)

Giri –
Sunan Prapen, Sultan (1548–1605)
Panembahan Kawis Gua, Sultan (1605–1621)
Panembahan Agung, Sultan (1621–1626)
Panembahan Mas Witana, Sultan (1626–1680)

Pasuruan –
Adipati Pekik, King (?–1614)
Ki Gede Kapulungan, Regent (c.1614–1616/17)
Surapati, Wiranegara I, Sultan (1686–1706)

Duchy of Surabaya (complete list) –
Panembahan Rama, Adipati (16th/17th century)
Pangeran Surabaya, Adipati (16th/17th century)
Pangeran Sunjaya, Adipati (17th century)
Raden Jayalengkara, Adipati (?–1625)

Tuban –
Arya Salempe, King (16th/17th century)
Pangeran Dalem, King (?–1619)

Cirebon, Keraton Kasepuhan (complete list) –
Sepuh I Syamsuddin, Sultan (1662–1697)
Sepuh II Jamaluddin, Sultan (1697–1723)

Cirebon, Kraton Kanoman (complete list) –
Anom I Badruddin, Sultan (1662–1703)

Cirebon, Panembahan line (complete list) –
Panembahan Cirebon I Muhammad Nasruddin, Sultan (1662–1714)

Cirebon, Kraton Kacirebonan (complete list) –
Pangeran Arya Cirebon, Kamaruddin, Sultan (1697–1723)

Bangkalan –
Raden Kara, Sultan (1592/6–1621)
Pangeran Mas, Sultan (1621–1624)
Cakraningrat I, Sultan (1624–1648)
Raden Demang Malaya Kusuma, Regent (1648–1656)
Cakraningrat II, Sultan (1648–1707)

Sumenep –
Pangeran Wetan, Sultan (c.1600)
Pangeran Ellor II, Sultan (?–1624)
Kyai Mas Anggadipa, Sultan (1624–?)
Arya Yang Pati, Sultan (?–1671)
Yudanegara, Sultan (1671–1684)
Pulang Jiwa, Sultan (1684–1702)

Pamekasan –
Adikara I, Sultan (1685–1708)

Mataram Sultanate (complete list) –
Senopati, Sultan (1587–1601)
Raden Mas Jolang, Sultan (1601–1613)
Agung, Sultan (1613–1645) 
Amangkurat I, Sultan (1646–1677)
Amangkurat II, Susuhunan (1677–1703)

Indonesia: Sumatra

Aceh Sultanate (complete list) –
Alauddin Ri'ayat Syah Sayyid al-Mukammal, Sultan (1589–1604)
Ali Ri'ayat Syah III, Sultan (1604–1607)
Iskandar Muda, Sultan (1607–1636)
Iskandar Thani, Sultan (1636–1641)
Taj ul-Alam, Queen (1641–1675)
Nurul Alam Naqiatuddin Syah, Queen (1675–1678)
Inayat Zakiatuddin Syah, Queen (1678–1688)
Zainatuddin, Queen (1688–1699)
Badr ul-Alam Syarif Hasyim Jamaluddin, Sultan (1699–1702)

Sultanate of Deli (complete list) –
Gocah Pahlawan, Sultan (1632–1669)
Perunggit, Sultan (1669–1698)
Tuanku Panglima Paderap, Sultan (1698–1728)

Sultanate of Langkat –
Panglima Dewa Sakti, Raja (1580–1612)
Kahar bin Panglima Dewa Sakdi, Raja (1612–1673)
Bendahara Raja Badiuzzaman, Raja (1673–1750)

Johor Sultanate (complete list) –
Alauddin Riayat Shah III, Sultan (1597–1615)
Abdullah Ma'ayat Shah, Sultan (1615–1623)
Abdul Jalil Shah III, Sultan of Pahang (1615–1617) of Johor (1623–1677)
Ibrahim Shah, Sultan (1677–1685)
Mahmud Shah II, Sultan (1685–1699)
Abdul Jalil Shah IV, Sultan (1699–1720)

Jambi Sultanate –
Hilir Jambi, Sultan (1687–1696)
Sultan Sri Maharaja Batu, Sultan (1690–1721)

Indonesia: Kalimantan (Borneo)

Sultanate of Banjar (complete list) –
Mustain Billah, Sultan (1595–1638)
Inayatullah bin Mustainbillah, Sultan (1642–1647)
Saidullah, Sultan (1647–1660)
Ri'ayatullah, Sultan (1660–1663)
Amrullah Bagus Kasuma, Sultan (1663–1679)
Agung/Pangeran Suryanata II, Sultan (1663–1679)
Amrullah Bagus Kasuma, Sultan (1679–1700)
Tahmidullah I, Sultan (1700–1717)

Bulungan –
Kelana, Putera Singa Laut, Wira (1618–1640)
Keranda, Putera Wira Kelana, Wira (1640–1695)
Digendung, putra Wira Keranda, Wira (1695–1731)

Kutai Kartanegara Sultanate –
Aji Pangeran Sinum Panji Mendapa, Sultan (c.1635–1650)

Sultanate of Sambas (complete list) –
Timbang Paseban, Governor, Sultan (1600–1609)
Sepudak, King (1609–1632)
Anom Kesumayuda, King (1632–1670)
Muhammad Shafi ud-din I, Sultan (1675–1685)
Muhammad Taj ud-din I, Sultan (1685–1708)

Sultanate of Sintang –
Abang Pencin Pontin, Prince (c.1600–1643)
Tunggal, Prince (c.1643–1672)
Sri Paduka Muhammad Shams ud-din Sa'id ul-Khairiwaddien Sultan Nata, Sultan (1672–1738)

Indonesia: Sulawesi

Bone state –
Latenri Tuppu Matinro Ri Sidenreng, King (c.1605)

Sultanate of Gowa –
Alau'ddin, Sultan (1593–1639)
Malikussaid (Muhammad Said), Sultan (1639–1653)
Hasanuddin, Sultan (1653–1669)
Amir Hamzah, Sultan (1669–1674)
Muhammad Ali (Karaeng Bisei), Sultan (1674–1677)
Abdul Jalil, Sultan (1677–1709)

Luwu –
Andi Pattiware’ Daeng Parabung, Datu (1587–1615)
Patipasaung, Datu (1615–1637)
La Basso, Datu (1637–1663)
Settiaraja, Datu (1663–1704)
Petta Matinroe’ ri Polka, Datu (1660s)

Indonesia: Lesser Sunda Islands

Bali Kingdom: Gelgel (complete list) –
Dalem Seganing, King (c.1580–1623 or ?–1650)
Dalem Di Made, King (1623–1642 or 1655–1665)
Dewa Pacekan, King (1642–1650)
Dewa Cawu, King (1651–c.1655)
Anglurah Agung, usurper King (c.1665–1686)

Kingdom of Larantuka –
Ola Adobala, Raja (c.1665)
Luis, Raja (c.1675)

Bima Sultanate (complete list) –
Abdul Kahir, Sultan (c.1620–1640)
Ambela Abu'l-Khair Sirajuddin, Sultan (1640–1682)
Nuruddin Abubakar Ali Syah, Sultan (1682–1687)
Jamaluddin Ali Syah, Sultan (1687–1696)
Hasanuddin Muhammad Ali Syah, Sultan (1697–1731)

Indonesia: West Timor

Amanatun (complete list) –
Pedro of Batumean, Raja (c.1642)
João of Batumean, Raja (c.1645)

Amarasi (complete list) –
Dom António I, Raja (?–1665)
Dom Tomás, Raja (1665–?)
Dom António II, Raja (c.1688)

Amabi (complete list) –
Sebastião, Raja (c.1652)
Saroro Neno, Raja (c.1655)
Ama Kefi Meu, Raja (1666–1704)

Sonbai Besar (complete list) –
Ama Tuan/ Ama Utang, Emperor (c.1650–c.1680)

Sonbai Kecil (complete list) –
Ama Tuan II, Raja (1659–1672)
Bi Sonbai/ Usi Tetu Utang, Queen (1672–1717)

Indonesia: Maluku Islands

Sultanate of Bacan (complete list) –
Alauddin I, Sultan (1581–c.1609)
Nurusalat, Sultan (c.1609–1649)
Muhammad Ali, Sultan (1649–1660)
Dutch protectorate 1667–1942
Alauddin II, Sultan (1660–1706)

Sultanate of Jailolo –
Kodrat, Sultan (?–c.1605)
Dua, Sultan (c.1605–1613)
Raja Buka, Sultan (1613–1656)
Kaicil Alam, Sultan (c.1679–1684)

Sultanate of Tidore (complete list) –
Mole Majimu, Sultan (1599–1627)
Ngarolamo, Sultan (1627–1634)
Gorontalo, Sultan (1634–1639)
Saidi, Sultan (1640–1657)
Saifuddin, Golofino, Sultan (1657–1689)
Dutch protectorate 1657–1905
Hamza Faharuddin, Sultan (1689–1705)

Sultanate of Ternate (complete list) –
Said Barakat Shah, Sultan (1583–1606)
Muzaffar Shah I, Sultan (1607–1627)
Hamzah, Sultan (1627–1648)
Mandar Shah/ Manlarsaha, Sultan (1648–1650)
Manilha, Sultan (1650–1655)
Mandar Shah, Sultan (1655–1675)
Dutch protectorate 1683–1915
Sibori, Sultan (1675–1689)
Said Fathullah, Sultan (1689–1714)

Laos

Lan Xang (complete list) –
Voravongsa II, King (1598–1622)
Oupagnouvarath, King (1622–1623)
Photisarath II, King (1623–1627)
Mon Keo, King (1621–1622)
Tone Kham, King (1627–1633)
Vichai, King (1633–1637)
Souligna Vongsa, King (1637–1695)
Tian Thala, King (c.1695)
Ong Lo, King (1694–1698)
Nan Tharat, King (1699)
Setthathirath II, King (1700–1707)

Muang Phuan (complete list) –
Kham Sanh, King (1651–1688)
Kam Lan, King (1688–1700)

Malaysia

Malaysia: Peninsula

Kedah Sultanate (complete list) –
Mudzaffar Shah III, Sultan, (1547–1602)
Sulaiman Shah II, Sultan, (1602–1626)
Rijaluddin Muhammad Shah, Sultan, (1626–1652)
Muhyiddin Mansur Shah, Sultan, (1652–1662)
Dziaddin Mukarram Shah I, Sultan, (1662–1688)
Ataullah Muhammad Shah II, Sultan, (1688–1698)
Abdullah Mu'adzam Shah, Sultan, (1698–1706)

Kelantan Sultanate: Champa dynasty (complete list) –
Muhammad ibni al-Marhum Sultan Ibrahim, Sultan (1597–1602)
Addil ud-din, Sultan (1579–1597, 1602–1605)
Samir ud-din, Sultan (1605–1616)
'Abdu'l Kadir, Sultan (1616–1637)
Sakti I, Raja (1637–1649)
Loyor bin Raja Sakti I, Raja (1649–1663)
Puteri Saadong, Raja (1663–1667)
Sa'adong I, Rata (1667–1671)
Abdul Rahim, Sultan (1671–1676)
Omar Ibni Al-Marhum Raja Sakti I, Sultan (1675–1721)

Pahang Sultanate (complete list) –
Abdul Ghafur Muhiuddin Shah, Sultan (1592–1614)
Alauddin Riayat Shah, Sultan (1614–1615)
Abdul Jalil Shah III, Sultan (1615–1617) of Johor (1623–1677)
Abdul Jalil Shah III, Sultan of Pahang (1615–1617), Sultan of Johor (1623–1677)

Johor Sultanate (complete list) –
Alauddin Riayat Shah III, Sultan (1597–1615)
Abdullah Ma'ayat Shah, Sultan (1615–1623)
Abdul Jalil Shah III, Sultan of Pahang (1615–1617), Sultan of Johor (1623–1677)
Ibrahim Shah, Sultan (1677–1685)
Mahmud II, Sultan (1685–1699)
Abdul Jalil Shah IV, Sultan (1699–1720)

Perak Sultanate (complete list) –
Malacca dynasty
Alauddin Riayat Shah I, Sultan (1594–1603)
Mukaddam Riayat Shah I, Sultan (1603–1619)
Ahmad Mansur Riayat Shah II, Sultan (1619–1627)
Mahmud Riayat Shah I, Sultan (1627–1630)
Sallehuddin Riayat Shah, Sultan (1630–1636)
Siak dynasty
Muzaffar Riayat Shah II, Sultan (1636–1653)
Mahmud Iskandar Shah, Sultan (1653–1720)

Malaysian Borneo
Sultanate of Sarawak –
Tengah, Sultan (1599–1641)

Myanmar / Burma

Kingdom of Mrauk U (complete list) –
Razagyi, King (1593–1612)
Khamaung, King (1612–1622)
Thiri Thudhamma, King (1622–1638)
Sanay, King (1638)
Narapati, King (1638–1645)
Thado, King (1645–1652)
Sanda Thudhamma, King (1652–1674)
Thiri Thuriya, King (1674–1685)
Wara Dhammaraza, King (1685–1692)
Muni Thudhammaraza, King (1692–1694)
Sanda Thuriya I, King (1694–1696)
Nawrahta, King (1696)
Mayuppiya, King (1696–1697)
Kalamandat, King (1697–1698)
Naradipati, King (1698–1700)
Sanda Wimala I, King (1700–1707)

Toungoo dynasty (complete list) –
Nyaungyan Min, King (1599–1605)
Anaukpetlun, King (1605–1628)
Minyedeippa, King (1628–1629)
Thalun, King (1629–1648)
Pindale Min, King (1648–1661)
Pye Min, King (1661–1672)
Narawara, King (1672–1673)
Minyekyawdin, King (1673–1698)
Sanay Min, King (1698–1714)

Philippines

Sultanate of Sulu (complete list) –
Batarah Shah Tengah, Sultan (1596–1608)
Muwallil Wasit I, Sultan (1610–1650)
Muhammad Kudarat, Sultan of Maguindanao (1619–1671), Sultan of Sulu as Nasir ud-Din II (1645–1648)
Salah ud-Din, Sultan (1649/50–1680)
Ali Shah, Sultan (late 17th century)
Nur ul-Azam, ruler (late 17th century)
Shahab ud-Din, Sultan (1685–1710)

Sultanate of Maguindanao (complete list) –
Kapitan Laut Buisan, Sultan (1597–1619)
Muhammad Kudarat, Sultan of Maguindanao (1619–1671), Sultan of Sulu as Nasir ud-Din II (1645–1648)
Barahaman, Sultan (c.1678–1699)
Kahar Ud-din Kuda, Sultan (?–1702)

Spanish East Indies, part of the Captaincy General of the Philippines (complete list) –
Colony, 1565–1901
For details see Spain in southwest Europe

Taiwan

Kingdom of Tungning: House of Koxinga (complete list) –
Koxinga, Prince (1661–1662)
Zheng Xi, Protector (1662)
Zheng Jing, Prince (1662–1681)
Zheng Kezang, Prince Regent (1681)
Zheng Kezang, Prince (1681–1683)

Thailand

Ayutthaya Kingdom (complete list) –
Sukhothai dynasty
Naresuan, King of Sukhothai (1570–1590), King of Ayutthaya (1590–1605)
Ekathotsarot, King (1605–1620)
Si Saowaphak, King (1620)
Songtham, King (1620–1628)
Chetthathirat, King (1628–1629)
Athittayawong, King (1629)
Prasat Thong dynasty
Prasat Thong, King (1629–1656)
Chai, King (1656)
Si Suthammaracha, King (1656)
Narai, King (1656–1688)
Ban Phlu Luang dynasty
Phetracha, King (1688–1703)

Lan Na: Burmese rule (complete list) –
Nawrahta Minsaw, King (1579–1607/08)
Thado Minsaw (Phra Choi), King (1607/08–1608/09)
Minye Deibba (Phra Chaiyathip), King (1608/09–1614)
Thado Kyaw, King (1614)
Si Songmueang, King (1615–1631)
Thipphanet, Lord (1631–1655)
Phra Saenmueang, King (1655–1659)
King of Phrae, King (1659–1672)
Uengsae of Ava, Viceroy (1672–1675)
Che Putarai, King (1675–1707)

Pattani Kingdom (complete list) –
Inland dynasty
Ratu Hijau, Queen (1584–1616)
Ratu Biru, Queen (1616–1624)
Ratu Ungu, Queen (1624–1635)
Ratu Kuning, Queen (1635–1649/88)
First Kelantanese dynasty
Bakal, Raja (1688–1690 or 1651–1670)
Emas Kelantan, Raja (1690–1704 or 1670–1698)
Emas Chayam, Queen (1704–1707 or 1698–1702 and 1716–1718)

Vietnam

Champa (complete list) –
Po Ro Me, King (1627–1651)
Po Niga, King (1652–1660)
Po Saut, King (1660–1692)
Po Saktirai da putih, King (1695–1728)

Đại Việt: Mạc dynasty (complete list) –
Mạc Kính Cung, Emperor (1593–1625)
Mạc Kính Khoan, Emperor (1623–1638)
Mạc Kính Vũ, Emperor (1638–1677)

Đại Việt: Revival Lê dynasty (complete list) –
Lê Kính Tông, Emperor (1600–1619)
Lê Thần Tông, Emperor (1619–1643, 1649–1662)
Lê Chân Tông, Emperor (1643–1649)
Lê Huyền Tông, Emperor (1663–1671)
Lê Gia Tông, Emperor (1672–1675)
Lê Hy Tông, Emperor (1676–1704)

Đàng Ngoài: Trịnh lords (complete list) –
Trịnh Tùng, Lord (1570–1623)
Trịnh Tráng, Lord (1623–1652)
Trịnh Tạc, Lord (1653–1682)
Trịnh Căn, Lord (1682–1709)

Đàng Trong: Nguyễn lords (complete list) –
Nguyễn Hoàng, Lord (1558–1613)
Nguyễn Phúc Nguyên, Lord (1613–1635)
Nguyễn Phúc Lan, Lord (1635–1648)
Nguyễn Phúc Tần, Lord (1648–1687)
Nguyễn Phúc Thái, Lord (1687–1691)
Nguyễn Phúc Chu, Lord (1691–1725)

Asia: South

Asia: West

Iran

Safavid Iran (complete list) –
Abbas I, Shah (1587–1629)
Safi, Shah (1629–1642)
Abbas II, Shah (1642–1666)
Suleiman I, Shah (1666–1694)
Husayn, Sultan (1694–1722)

Baban (complete list) –
Faqi Ahmad, Prince (1649–1670)
Sulaiman Baba, Prince (1670–1703)

Oman

Imamate of Oman: Nabhani dynasty (complete list) –
Abdulla bin Muhammad, Malik (1560–1624)

Imamate of Oman: Yaruba dynasty (complete list) –
Nasir bin Murshid, Imam (1624–1649)
Sultan bin Saif, Imam (1649–1679), Portuguese protectorate ended with 1650
Bil'arab bin Sultan, Imam (1679–1692)
Saif bin Sultan, Imam (1692–1711)

Saudi Arabia

Bani Khalid Emirate (complete list) –
Barak bin Ghurair bin Masoud Al Hamid, Emir (1669–1682)
Muhammad bin Ghurair, Emir (1682–1691)
Sa'dun bin Muhammad, Emir (1691–1722)

Turkey

Ottoman Empire
Sultans –
Mehmed III, Sultan (1595–1603)
Ahmed I, Sultan (1603–1617)
Mustafa I, Sultan (1617–1618, 1622–1623)
Osman II, Sultan (1618–1622)
Murad IV, Sultan (1623–1640)
Ibrahim I, Sultan (1640–1648)
Mehmed IV, Sultan (1648–1687)
Suleiman II, Sultan (1687–1691)
Ahmed II, Sultan (1691–1695)
Mustafa II, Sultan (1695–1703)
Grand Viziers –
Damat Ibrahim Pasha, Grand Vizier (1599–1601)
Yemişçi Hasan Pasha, Grand Vizier (1601–1603)
Yavuz Ali Pasha, Grand Vizier (1603–1604)
Sokolluzade Lala Mehmed Pasha, Grand Vizier (1604–1606)
Boşnak Derviş Mehmed Pasha, Grand Vizier (1606)
Kuyucu Murad Pasha, Grand Vizier (1606–1611)
Nasuh Pasha, Grand Vizier (1611–1614)
Öküz Mehmed Pasha, Grand Vizier (1614–1616)
Damat Halil Pasha, Grand Vizier (1616–1619)
Öküz Mehmed Pasha, Grand Vizier (1619–1619)
Güzelce Ali Pasha, Grand Vizier (1619–1621)
Ohrili Hüseyin Pasha, Grand Vizier (1621)
Dilaver Pasha, Grand Vizier (1621–1622)
Kara Davud Pasha, Grand Vizier (1622)
Mere Hüseyin Pasha, Grand Vizier (1622)
Lefkeli Mustafa Pasha, Grand Vizier (1622)
Gürcü Hadım Mehmed Pasha, Grand Vizier (1622–1623)
Mere Hüseyin Pasha, Grand Vizier (1623)
Kemankeş Kara Ali Pasha, Grand Vizier (1623–1624)
Çerkes Mehmed Pasha, Grand Vizier (1624–1625)
Filibeli Hafız Ahmed Pasha, Grand Vizier (1625–1626)
Damat Halil Pasha, Grand Vizier (1626–1628)
Gazi Ekrem Hüsrev Pasha, Grand Vizier (1628–1631)
Hafiz Ahmed Pasha, Grand Vizier (1631–1632)
Topal Recep Pasha, Grand Vizier (1632)
Tabanıyassı Mehmed Pasha, Grand Vizier (1632–1637)
Bayram Pasha, Grand Vizier (1637–1638)
Tayyar Mehmed Pasha, Grand Vizier (1638)
Kemankeş Mustafa Pasha, Grand Vizier (1638–1644)
Sultanzade Mehmed Pasha, Grand Vizier (1644–1645)
Nevesinli Salih Pasha, Grand Vizier (1645–1647)
Kara Musa Pasha, Grand Vizier (1647)
Hezarpare Ahmed Pasha, Grand Vizier (1647–1648)
Sofu Mehmed Pasha, Grand Vizier (1648–1649)
Kara Murat Pasha, Grand Vizier (1649–1650)
Melek Ahmed Pasha, Grand Vizier (1650–1651)
Abaza Siyavuş Pasha I, Grand Vizier (1651)
Gürcü Mehmed Pasha, Grand Vizier (1651–1652)
Tarhoncu Ahmed Pasha, Grand Vizier (1652–1653)
Bıyıklı Koca Derviş Mehmed Pasha, Grand Vizier (1653–1654)
Ibşir Mustafa Pasha, Grand Vizier (1654–1655)
Kara Dev Murad Pasha, Grand Vizier (1655)
Ermeni Süleyman Pasha, Grand Vizier (1655)
Gazi Hüseyin Pasha, Grand Vizier (1656)
Zurnazen Mustafa Pasha, Grand Vizier (1656)
Abaza Siyavuş Pasha I, Grand Vizier (1656)
Boynuyaralı Mehmed Pasha, Grand Vizier (1656)
Köprülü Mehmed Pasha, Grand Vizier (1656–1661)
Köprülü Fazıl Ahmed Pasha, Grand Vizier (1661–1676)
Merzifonlu Kara Mustafa Pasha, Grand Vizier (1676–1683)
Bayburtlu Kara Ibrahim Pasha, Grand Vizier (1683–1685)
Sarı Süleyman Pasha, Grand Vizier (1685–1687)
Abaza Siyavuş Pasha II, Grand Vizier (1687–1688)
Ayaşlı Ismail Pasha, Grand Vizier (1688)
Tekirdağlı Bekri Mustafa Pasha, Grand Vizier (1688–1689)
Köprülü Fazıl Mustafa Pasha, Grand Vizier (1689–1691)
Bahadırzade Arabacı Ali Pasha, Grand Vizier (1691–1692)
Merzifonlu Çalık Hacı Ali Pasha, Grand Vizier (1692–1693)
Bozoklu (Bıyıklı)Mustafa Pasha, Grand Vizier (1694)
Sürmeli Ali Pasha, Grand Vizier (1694–1695)
Elmas Mehmed Pasha, Grand Vizier (1695–1697)
Amcazade Köprülü Hüseyin Pasha, Grand Vizier (1697–1702)

Yemen

Wahidi Balhaf of Ba´l Haf (complete list) –
Salih ibn Nasir al-Wahidi, Sultan (c.1640–1670)
al-Hadi ibn Salih al-Wahidi, Sultan (c.1670–1706)

Emirate of Beihan (complete list) –
Muqbil, Amir (1680–?)
Hasan, Amir (?)

Kathiri (complete list) –
Dscha'far ibn 'Abdallah al-Kathir, Sultan (1670–1690)
Badr ibn Dscha'far al-Kathir, Sultan (1690–1707)

Yemeni Zaidi State (complete list) –
al-Mansur al-Qasim, Imam (1597–1620)
al-Mu'ayyad Muhammad, Imam (1620–1640)
al-Mutawakkil Isma'il, Imam (1640–1676)
al-Mahdi Ahmad, Imam (1676–1681)
al-Mu'ayyad Muhammad II, Imam (1681–1686)
al-Mahdi Muhammad, Imam (1689–1718)

Lower Yafa –
Afif, ruler (1681–1700)
Qahtan ibn Afif, ruler (1700–1720)

Europe

Europe: Balkans

Prince-Bishopric of Montenegro (complete list) –
Ruvim II, Prince-bishop (1593–1636)
Mardarije I, Prince-bishop (1639–1649)
Visarion I, Prince-bishop (1649–1659)
Mardarije II, Prince-bishop (1659–1673)
Ruvim III, Prince-bishop (1673–1685)
Vasilije II, Prince-bishop (1685)
Visarion II, Prince-bishop (1685–1692)
Sava Očinić, Prince-bishop (1694–1696)
Danilo I, Prince-bishop (1696–1735)

Croatia

Kingdom of Croatia (Habsburg)
Kings (complete list) –
part of the Habsburg monarchy, also part of the Lands of the Hungarian Crown
House of Habsburg
Rudolph, King (1576–1608)
Matthias II, King (1608–1619)
Ferdinand II, King (1619–1637)
Ferdinand III, King (1637–1657)
Ferdinand IV, King (1647–1654)
Leopold I, King (1657–1705)
Bans (complete list) –
Péter ZrínyiPeter Zrinski, Ban (1665–1670)
Miklós Erdődy, Ban (1670–1693)
Adam II. Batthyány, Ban (1693–1703)

Republic of Ragusa (complete list) –
Antun Orsata Gondole, Rector (1601)
Sabo Menze, Rector (1602)
Marin Tudisi, Rector (1603)
Frano Caboga, Rector (1611)
Vlaho Gondola, Rector (1612)
Marin Sorgo, Rector (1614)
Stijepo Prodanello, Rector (1615)
Stijepo Proculo, Rector (1616)
Lamprica Cerva, Rector (1617)
Jero Bona, Rector (1618)
Niko Gozze, Rector (1619)
Frano Sorgo, Rector (1620)
Tomo Basilio, Rector (1621)
Đivo Menze, Rector (1622)
Đivo Clasci, Rector (1623)
Frano Nika Sorga, Rector (1624)
Pijero Cerva, Rector (1627)
Pijero Cerva, Rector (1628)
Pavo Pozza, Rector (1629)
Jero Gozze, Marin Menze, Rector (1630)
Đivo Nika Gondole, Rector (1631)
Simo Menze, Rector (1639)
Pavo Pozza, Rector (1640)
Džono Resti, Rector (1641)
Luko Andra Sorga, Rector (1642)
Pavo Pozza, Rector (1643)
Luco Caboga, Rector (1651)
Luko Sorgo, Rector (1652)
Sabo Bona, Rector (1653)
Frano Ghetaldi, Rector (1654)
Marin Proculo, Rector (1655)
Ivan Bunić Vučić, Marko Pozza, Rector (?–1658)
Cerva, Rector (1659–?)
Luko Gozze, Rector (1660–?)
Marin Proculo, Rector (1661)
Frano Šiška Sorga, Rector (1662)
Beno Bona, Rector (1663)
Simo Menze, Rector (1664)
Luko Resti, Rector (1665)
Simo Ghetaldi, Miho Menze, Rector (1667–?)
Marin Sorgo, Rector (1670)
Đivo Mata Ghetaldi, Rector (1671)
Jero Menze, Rector (1672)
Kliment Menze, Rector (1680)
Mato Bunić, Rector (1681)
Niko Binčulić, Rector (1682)
Klement Menze, Rector (1683)
Stijepo Tudisi, Šišmundo Gundulić, Rector (?–1684)
Mato Gondola, Rector (?-?)
Lovrijenac Sorgo, Rector (1692)
Rafo Gozze, Rector (1693)
Đivo Karla Sorga, Rector (1694)
Jero Menze, Rector (1695)
Dominko Bucchia, Rector (1696)
Đivo Šiška Gondole, Vlađ Bona, Rector (1699)
Vlaho Cerva, Rector (1700)

Europe: British Isles

Kingdom of England, Kingdom of Scotland, Kingdom of Ireland (complete list, complete list) –
Elizabeth I, Queen of England and Ireland (1558–1603)
James VI & I, King of Scotland (1567–1625), King of England and Ireland (1603–1625)
Charles I, King (1625–1649)

Commonwealth of England –
English Council of State, (1649–1653, 1659–1660)

The Protectorate: Commonwealth of England, Scotland, and Ireland (complete list) –
Oliver Cromwell, Lord Protector (1653–1658)
Richard Cromwell, Lord Protector (1658–1659)

Kingdom of England, Kingdom of Scotland, Kingdom of Ireland (complete list, complete list) –
Charles II, King of Scotland (1649–1651, 1660–1685), King of England and Ireland (1660–1685)
James II & VII, King (1685–1688)
Mary II, Queen co-regnant (1689–1694) and William III & II, King co-regnant (1689–1702)

Ireland

East Breifne (complete list) –
Edmond, ruler (1596–1601)
Owen, ruler (1601–1609)

West Breifne (complete list) –
Tadhg Ó Ruairc, Lord (1600–1605)

Leinster (complete list) –
Domhnall Spáinneach mac Murchadha Caomhánach, King (1582–1603)

Síol Anmchadha (complete list) –
Domhnall Ó Madadhan, Lord (1567–1612)
Anmchadh Ó Madadhan, Lord (1612–1636)

Europe: Central

Holy Roman Empire, Kingdom of Germany
Emperors Elect, Kings –
Rudolph II, Emperor Elect (1576–1612), King (1575–1612)
Matthias, Emperor Elect (1612–1619), King (1612–1618)
Ferdinand II, Emperor Elect (1619–1637), King (1618–1637)
Ferdinand III, Emperor Elect (1637–1657), King (1636–1657)
Ferdinand IV, co-King (1653–1654)
Leopold I, Emperor Elect, King (1658–1705)
Reichsvizekanzler: Vice Chancellor –
Rudolf Coraduz von und zu Nußdorf, Vice Chancellor (1597–1606)
Leopold von Stralendorf, Vice Chancellor (1606–1612)
Hans Ludwig von Ulm, Vice Chancellor (1612–1627)
Peter Heinrich von Stralendorf, Vice Chancellor (1627–1637)
Ferdinand Sigismund Graf Kurtz von Senftenau, Vice Chancellor (1637–1659)
Wilderich von Walderdorff, Vice Chancellor (1660–1669)
Leopold Wilhelm Graf von Königsegg-Rothenfels, Vice Chancellor (1669–1694)
Gottlieb Amadeus Graf von Windisch-Graetz, Vice Chancellor (1694–1695)
Dominik Andreas I. von Kaunitz, Vice Chancellor (1698–1705)

Austria

Habsburg monarchy (complete list) –
Habsburg monarchs ruled under numerous simultaneous titles
Rudolf II, (1576–1612)
Matthias, (1612–1619)
Ferdinand II, (1619–1637)
Ferdinand III, (1637–1657)
Leopold I, (1657–1705)

Hungary

Kingdom of Hungary (1526–1867) (complete list) –
Rudolph, King (1576–1608)
Matthias II, King (1608–1619)
Ferdinand II, King (1619–1637)
Ferdinand III, King (1637–1657)
Ferdinand IV, King (1647–1654)
Leopold I, King (1657–1705)

Poland

Polish–Lithuanian Commonwealth: Kingdom of Poland (complete list) –
Sigismund III Vasa, King and Grand Duke (1587–1632)
Władysław IV Vasa, King and Grand Duke (1632–1648)
John II Casimir Vasa, King and Grand Duke (1648–1668)
Michał Korybut Wiśniowiecki, King and Grand Duke (1669–1673)
John III Sobieski, King and Grand Duke (1674–1696)
Augustus II the Strong, King and Grand Duke (1697–1706, 1709–1733)

Duchy of Prussia (complete list) –
Albert Frederick, Duke (1568–1618)
John Sigismund, Duke (1618–1619)
George William, Duke (1619–1640)
Frederick William, Duke (1640–1688)
Frederick I, Duke (1688–1701), King (1701–1713)

Europe: East

Crimean Khanate (complete list) –
Ğazı II Giray, Khan (1596–1607)
Toqtamış Giray, Khan (1607–1608)
Selâmet I Giray, Khan (1608–1610)
Canibek Giray, Khan (1610–1623)
Mehmed III Giray, Khan (1623–1628)
Canibek Giray, Khan (1628–1635)
İnayet Giray, Khan (1635–1637)
Bahadır I Giray, Khan (1637–1641)
Mehmed IV Giray, Khan (1641–1644)
İslâm III Giray, Khan (1644–1654)
Mehmed IV Giray, Khan (1654–1666)
Adil Giray, Khan (1666–1671)
Selim I Giray, Khan (1671–1678)
Murad Giray, Khan (1678–1683)
Hacı II Giray, Khan (1683–1684)
Selim I Giray, Khan (1684–1691)
Saadet III Giray, Khan (1691)
Safa Giray, Khan (1691–1692)
Selim I Giray, Khan (1692–1699)
Devlet II Giray, Khan (1699–1702)

Polish–Lithuanian Commonwealth: Grand Duchy of Lithuania (complete list) –
Sigismund III Vasa, King and Grand Duke (1587–1632)
Władysław IV Vasa, King and Grand Duke (1632–1648)
John II Casimir Vasa, King and Grand Duke (1648–1668)
Michał Korybut Wiśniowiecki, King and Grand Duke (1669–1673)
John III Sobieski, King and Grand Duke (1674–1696)
Augustus II the Strong, King and Grand Duke (1697–1706, 1709–1733)

Moldavia (complete list) –
Ieremia Movilă, Voivode (1595–1600, 1600–1606)
Simion Movilă, Voivode (1606–1607)
Mihail II Movilă, Voivode (1607, 1607)
Constantin I Movilă, Voivode (1607, 1607–1611)
Ștefan IX Tomșa, Voivode (1611–1615, 1621–1623)
Alexandru VI Movilă, Voivode (1615–1616)
Radu Mihnea, Voivode (1616–1619, 1623–1626)
Gaspar Graziani, Voivode (1619–1620)
Alexandru VII Iliaş, Voivode (1620–1621, 1631–1633)
Miron Barnovschi-Movilă, Voivode (1626–1629, 1633)
Alexandru VIII Coconul, Voivode (1626–1629)
Moise Movilă, Voivode (1630–1631, 1633–1634)
Vasile Lupu, Voivode (1634–1653, 1653)
Gheorghe II Ștefan, Voivode (1653, 1653–1658)
Gheorghe III Ghica, Voivode (1658–1659)
Constantin Șerban, Voivode (1659, 1661)
Ștefan X Lupu, Voivode (1659–1661, 1661)
Eustratie Dabija, Voivode (1661–1665)
Gheorghe IV Duca, Voivode (1665–1666, 1668–1672, 1678–1683)
Iliaș III Alexandru, Voivode (1666–1668)
Ștefan XI Petriceicu, Voivode (1672–1673, 1673–1674, 1683–1684)
Dumitrașcu Cantacuzino, Voivode (1673, 1674–1675, 1684–1685)
Antonie Ruset, Voivode (1675–1678)
Constantin Cantemir, Voivode (1685–1693)
Dimitrie Cantemir, Voivode (1693, 1710–1711)
Constantin Duca, Voivode (1693–1695, 1700–1703)
Antioh Cantemir, Prince (1695–1700, 1705–1707)

Qasim Khanate (complete list) –
Eid al-Muhammad, Khan (1600–1610)
Arslanghali, Khan (1614–1627)
Sayed Borhan, Sultan (1627–1679)
Fatima Soltan, Khanum (1679–1681)

Tsardom of Russia (complete list) –
Boris Godunov, Tsar (1598–1605)
Feodor II, Tsar (1605)
Dmitriy I, Tsar (1605–1606)
Vasili IV, Tsar (1606–1610)
Vladislav I, Tsar (1610–1612)
Michael I, Tsar (1613–1645)
Alexis, Tsar (1645–1676)
Feodor III, Tsar (1676–1682)
Peter I, Tsar (1682–1721), Emperor (1721–1725)
Ivan V, co-Tsar (1682–1696)

Principality of Transylvania (1570–1711) (complete list) –
Giorgio Basta, commissioner (1600–1601, 1601–1603)
Sigismund Báthory, Prince (1586–1598, 1598–1599, 1601–1602)
Moses Székely, Prince (1603)
Radu Șerban, Voivode (1603), Prince (July 1603–September 1603
Giorgio Basta, commissioner (1603–1604)
Stephen Bocskai, Prince (1605–1606)
Sigismund Rákóczi, Prince (1607–1608)
Gabriel Báthory, Prince (1608–1613)
Gabriel Bethlen, Prince (1613–1629)
Catherine of Brandenburg, Princess (1629–1630)
Stephen Bethlen, Prince (1630)
George I Rákóczi, Prince (1630–1648)
George II Rákóczi, Prince (1648–1657, 1658, 1659–1660)
Francis I Rákóczi, Prince (not installed)
Francis Rhédey, Prince (1657–1658)
Ákos Barcsay, Prince (1658–1659, 1660)
John Kemény, Prince (1661–1662)
Michael I Apafi, Prince (1661–1690)
Emeric Thököly, Prince (1690)
Michael II Apafi, Prince (1690–1696/1701)
Francis II Rákóczi, Prince (1704–1711)

Principality of Wallachia (complete list) –
Simion Movilă, Prince (1600–1601, 1602)
Radu IX Mihnea, Prince (1601–1602, 1611, 1611–1616, 1620–1623)
Radu X Șerban, Prince (1602–1610, 1611)
Transylvanian occupation: direct rule of Gabriel Báthory (1611) 
Gabriel Movilă, Prince (1616, 1618–1620)
Alexandru IV Iliaș, Prince (1616–1618, 1627–1629)
Alexandru V Coconul, Prince (1623–1627)
Leon Tomșa, Prince (1629–1632)
Radu XI Iliaș, Prince (1632)
Matei Basarab, Prince (1632–1654)
Constantin I Șerban, Prince (1654–1658)
Mihnea III, Prince (1658–1659)
Gheorghe I Ghica, Prince (1659–1660)
Grigore I Ghica, Prince (1660–1664, 1672–1673)
Radu XII Leon, Prince (1664–1669)
Antonie Vodă din Popeşti, Prince (1669–1672)
Gheorghe II Ducas, Prince (1673–1678)
Șerban Cantacuzino, Prince (1678–1688)
Constantin II Brâncoveanu, Prince (1688–1714)

Europe: Nordic

Denmark–Norway

Denmark–Norway (complete list / complete list) – 
Christian IV, King (1588–1648)
Frederick III, King (1648–1670)
Christian V, King (1670–1699)
Frederick IV, King (1699–1730)

Duchy of Schleswig (complete list) –
Christian IV of Denmark, Duke (1588–1648)
John Adolf, Duke of Holstein-Gottorp, Duke (1590–1616)
Frederick III, Duke of Holstein-Gottorp, Duke (1616–1659)
Frederick III of Denmark, Duke (1648–1670)
Christian Albert, Duke of Holstein-Gottorp, Duke (1659–1695)
Christian V of Denmark, Duke (1670–1699)
Frederick IV, Duke of Holstein-Gottorp, Duke (1695–1702)

Sweden

History of Sweden (1523–1611) (complete list) –
Charles IX, Regent (1599–1604), King (1604–1611)

Swedish Empire (complete list) –
Gustavus Adolphus, King (1611–1632)
Christina, Queen (1632–1654)
Charles X Gustav, King (1654–1660)
Charles XI, King (1660–1697)
Charles XII, King (1697–1718)

Europe: Southcentral

Duchy of Mantua (complete list) –
Vincenzo, Duke (1587–1612)
Francesco IV, Duke (1612)
Ferdinando, Duke (1612–1626)
Vincenzo II, Duke (1626–1627)
Charles I, Duke (1627–1637)
Charles II, Duke (1637–1665)
Ferdinando Carlo, Duke (1665–1708)

Principality of Massa and Margraviate of Carrara (complete list) –
Alberico I Cybo-Malaspina, Marquis (1554–1623), Prince and Marquis (1558–1623)
Carlo I Cybo-Malaspina, Prince and Marquis (1623–1662)
Alberico II Cybo-Malaspina, Prince and Marquis (1662–1690)

Duchy of Massa and Principality of Carrara (complete list) –
Alberico II Cybo-Malaspina, Prince and Marquis (1662–1664), Duke and Prince (1664–1690)
Carlo II Cybo-Malaspina, Duke and Prince (1690–1710)

Duchy of Montferrat (complete list) –
Vincent I, Duke (1587–1612)
Francis II, Duke (1612)
Ferdinand, Duke (1612–26)
Vincent II, Duke (1626–27)
War of the Mantuan Succession, ruler (1627–1631)
Maria, Duchess (1612–1661)
Charles I, Duke (1627–1637)
Charles II, ruler (1637–1665)
Ferdinand Charles, Duke (1665–1708)

Papal States (complete list) –
Clement VIII, Pope (1592–1605)
Leo XI, Pope (1605)
Paul V, Pope (1605–1621)
Gregory XV, Pope (1621–1623)
Urban VIII, Pope (1623–1644)
Innocent X, Pope (1644–1655)
Alexander VII, Pope (1655–1667)
Clement IX, Pope (1667–1669)
Clement X, Pope (1670–1676)
Innocent XI, Pope (1676–1689)
Alexander VIII, Pope (1689–1691)
Innocent XII, Pope (1691–1700)
Clement XI, Pope (1700–1721)

Duchy of Parma (complete list) –
Ranuccio I, Duke (1592–1622)
Odoardo, Duke (1622–1646)
Ranuccio II, Duke (1646–1694)
Francesco, Duke (1694–1727)

San Marino
Captains Regent (1500–1700) –

Grand Duchy of Tuscany (complete list) –
Ferdinando I, Grand Duke (1587–1609)
Cosimo II, Grand Duke (1609–1621)
Ferdinando II, Grand Duke (1621–1670)
Cosimo III, Grand Duke (1670–1723)

Republic of Venice (complete list) –
Marino Grimani, Doge (1595–1606)
Leonardo Donato, Doge (1606–1612)
Marcantonio Memmo, Doge (1612–1615)
Giovanni Bembo, Doge (1615–1618)
Nicolò Donato, Doge (1618–1618)
Antonio Priuli, Doge (1618–1623)
Francesco Contarini, Doge (1623–1624)
Giovanni I Cornaro, Doge (1624–1630)
Nicolò Contarini, Doge (1630–1631)
Francesco Erizzo, Doge (1631–1646)
Francesco Molin, Doge (1646–1655)
Carlo Contarini, Doge (1655–1656)
Francesco Cornaro, Doge (1656–1656)
Bertuccio Valiero, Doge (1656–1658)
Giovanni Pesaro, Doge (1658–1659)
Domenico II Contarini, Doge (1659–1674)
Nicolò Sagredo, Doge (1674–1676)
Alvise Contarini, Doge (1676–1683)
Marcantonio Giustinian, Doge (1683–1688)
Francesco Morosini, Doge (1688–1694)
Silvestro Valiero, Doge (1694–1700)
Alvise II Mocenigo, Doge (1700–1709)

Southern Italy

Kingdom of Naples (complete list) –
The Kingdom of Naples was ruled in personal union with Spain from 1504 to 1713.
Philip II, King (1598–1621)
Philip III, King (1621–1647)
Henry of Guise, Doge (1647–1648)
Philip III, King (1648–1665)
Charles V, King (1665–1700)
Philip IV, King (1700–1713)

Kingdom of Trinacria: Sicily (complete list) –
Philip III, King (1598–1621)
Philip IV, King (1621–1665)
Charles III, King (1665–1700)
Philip V, King (1700–1713)

Malta

Hospitaller Malta (complete list) –
Martín Garzés, Grand Master (1595–1601)
Alof de Wignacourt, Grand Master (1601–1622)
Luís Mendes de Vasconcellos, Grand Master (1622–1623)
Antoine de Paule, Grand Master (1623–1636)
Giovanni Paolo Lascaris, Grand Master (1636–1657)
Martin de Redin, Grand Master (1657–1660)
Annet de Clermont-Gessant, Grand Master (1660 )
Rafael Cotoner, Grand Master (1660–1663)
Nicolás Cotoner, Grand Master (1663–1680)
Gregorio Carafa, Grand Master (1680–1690)
Adrien de Wignacourt, Grand Master (1690–1697)
Ramón Perellós, Grand Master (1697–1720)

Europe: Southwest

Andorra

Andorra
Episcopal Co-Princes (complete list) –
Andreu Capella, Episcopal Co-Prince (1588–1609)
Bernat de Salba i Salba, Episcopal Co-Prince (1609–1620)
Luis Díez de Aux y Armendáriz, Episcopal Co-Prince (1622–1627)
Antonio Pérez, Episcopal Co-Prince (1627–1632)
Pau Duran, Episcopal Co-Prince (1634–1651)
Juan Manuel de Espinosa, Episcopal Co-Prince (1655–1663)
Melcior Palau i Bosca, Episcopal Co-Prince (1664–1670)
Pere de Copons i Teixidor, Episcopal Co-Prince (1671–1681)
Joan Baptista Desbac i Mortorell, Episcopal Co-Prince (1682–1688)
Oleguer de Montserrat i Rufet, Episcopal Co-Prince (1689–1694)
Julià Cano Thebar, Episcopal Co-Prince (1695–1714)
French Co-Princes (complete list) –
Henry IV, French Co-Prince (1572–1610)
Louis XIII, French Co-Prince (1610–1643)
Louis XIV, French Co-Prince (1643–1715)

Catalonia

Catalan Republic
Pau Claris, President (1641)

Navarre

Kingdom of Navarre (complete list) –
Henry III, King (1572–1610)
Louis II, King (1610–1620)

Portugal

Kingdom of Portugal (complete list) –
Philip II, King (1598–1621)
Philip III, King (1621–1640)
John IV, King (1640–1656)
Afonso VI, King (1656–1683)
Peter II, King (1683–1706)

Spain

Habsburg Spain: Crown of Castile and Crown of Aragon
Monarchs (complete list) –
Philip III the Pious, King (1598–1621)
Philip IV, King (1621–1665)
Charles II the Bewitched, King (1665–1700)

Europe: West

France

Kingdom of France: Ancien Régime (complete list) –
Henry IV, King (1589–1610)
Louis XIII, King (1610–1643)
Louis XIV, King (1643–1715)

Anjou (complete list) –
Gaston I, Duke (1608–1626)
Philip I, Duke (1640–1660)
Philippe Charles, Duke (1668–1671)
Louis Francis, Duke (1672)
Philip II, Duke (1683–1700)

Auvergne (complete list) –
Charles III, Duke of Lorraine, Count (1589–1608)
Margaret of Valois, Count (1608–1610)

County of Maine (complete list) –
Charles VI of Maine, Count (?–1611)
Henry, Duke of Mayenne, Count (1611–1621)
Charles II Gonzaga, Count (1621–1631)
Ferdinand Gonzaga, Count (1631–1632)
Charles III Gonzaga, Count (1632–?)

Monaco (complete list) –
Ercole, Lord (1589–1604)
Honoré II, Lord (1604–1612), Prince (1612–1662)
Louis I, Prince (1662–1701)

Duchy of Nevers (complete list) –
Charles III Gonzaga, Duke (1595–1637)
Charles IV Gonzaga, Duke (1637–1659)
Jules Mazarin, Duke (1659–1661)
Philippe Jules Mancini, Duke (1661–1707)

Low Countries

United Provinces: Dutch Republic
For the preceding rulers, look under the List of state leaders in the 16th-century Holy Roman Empire
Stadtholders (complete list) –
Maurice, Stadtholder (1585–1625)
Frederick Henry, Stadtholder (1625–1647)
William II, Stadtholder (1647–1650)
William III, Stadtholder (1672–1702)
Grand pensionaries (complete list) –
Johan van Oldenbarnevelt, Grand Pensionary (1586–1619)
Andries de Witt, Grand Pensionary (1619–1621)
Anthonie Duyck, Grand Pensionary (1621–1629)
Jacob Cats, Grand Pensionary (1629–1631)
Adriaan Pauw, Grand Pensionary (1631–1636)
Jacob Cats, Grand Pensionary (1636–1651)
Adriaan Pauw, Grand Pensionary (1651–1653)
Johan de Witt, Grand Pensionary (1653–1672)
Gaspar Fagel, Grand Pensionary (1672–1688)
Michiel ten Hove, Grand Pensionary (1688–1689)
Anthonie Heinsius, Grand Pensionary (1689–1720)

County of Drenthe (complete list) –
For the preceding rulers, see the County of Drenthe under the List of state leaders in the 16th-century Holy Roman Empire
Francisco Verdugo, Stadtholder (1581–1594)
Frederik van den Bergh, in name only, Stadtholder (1595–1618)
William Louis of Nassau-Dillenburg, Stadtholder (1595–1620)

County of Flanders (complete list) –
Isabella Clara Eugenia, Countess (1598–1621)
Philip VI, Count (1621–1665)
Charles IV, Count (1665–1700)
Philip VII, Count (1700–1706)

Lordship of Frisia (complete list) –
For the preceding rulers, see the Lordship of Frisia under the List of state leaders in the 16th-century Holy Roman Empire
Francisco Verdugo, Stadtholder (1581–1594)
William I, Stadtholder (1580–1884)
William Louis, Stadtholder (1584–1620)

Lordship of Groningen (complete list) –
For the preceding rulers, see the Lordship of Groningen under the List of state leaders in the 16th-century Holy Roman Empire
Francisco Verdugo, Stadtholder (1581–1594)
William Louis, Stadtholder (1584–1620)

Duchy of Guelders (complete list) –
For the preceding rulers, see the Duchy of Guelders under the List of state leaders in the 16th-century Holy Roman Empire
William IV of Bergh, Stadtholder (1581–1585)
Claude de Berlaymont, Stadtholder (1585–1587)
Florent de Berlaymont, Stadtholder (1587–1626)
Adolf van Nieuwenaar, Stadtholder (1584–1589)
Maurice, Stadtholder (1590–1625)

County of Holland, Lordship of Utrecht, County of Zeeland (complete list) –
For the preceding rulers, look under the List of state leaders in the 16th-century Holy Roman Empire
William I, Stadtholder (1572–1584)
Adolf van Nieuwenaar, Stadtholder (1584–1589)
Maurice, Stadtholder (1585–1625)

Lordship of Overijssel (complete list) –
For the preceding rulers, see the Lordship of Overijssel under the List of state leaders in the 16th-century Holy Roman Empire
Francisco Verdugo, Stadtholder (1581–1594)
Adolf van Nieuwenaar, Stadtholder (1584–1589)
Frederik van den Bergh, Stadtholder (1594–1618)

Eurasia: Caucasus

Azerbaijan

Baku Khanate (complete list) –
Mirza Muhammad I, Khan (1735–1768)
Fatali, Khan (1768–1770)
Abd Allah Beg, Khan (1770–1772)
Malik Muhammad, Khan (1772–1783)
Mirza Muhammad II, Khan (1783–1791)
Muhammad Quli, Khan (1791–1792)
Husayn Quli, Khan (1792–1797)
Mirza Muhammad II, Khan (1797–1801)

Ganja Khanate (complete list) –
Shahverdi, Khan (1747–1761)
Muhammad Hasan, Khan (1761–1781)
Ibrahim Khalil, Khan (1781–1784)
Hajji Beg, Khan (1784–1786)
Rahim, Khan (1786)
Javad, Khan (1786–1804)

Nakhichevan Khanate (complete list) –
Heydar Qoli, Khan (1747–1787)
Kalbali, Khan (1787–1823)

Quba Khanate (complete list) –
Huseyn Ali, Khan (1680–1721)
Ahmad, Khan (1721)
Chulaq Surkhay, Khan (1721–1722)
Husayn Ali, Khan (1722–1758)
Fatali, Khan (1758–1789)
Ahmad, Khan (1789–1791)
Shaykh Ali Agha, Khan (1791–1806)

Tabriz Khanate (complete list) –
Najaf Qoli I, Khan (1731–1785)
Khodadad, Khan (1785–1787)
Hossein Qoli, Khan (1786–1793, 1797–1798)
Jafar Qoli Donboli, Khan (1786–1802)

Georgia

Principality of Abkhazia (complete list) –
Putu, Prince (c.1580–1620)
Seteman, Prince (c.1620–1640)
Sustar, Prince (c.1640–1665)
Zegnak, Prince (c.1665–1700)

Kingdom of Imereti (complete list) –
Rostom, King (1588–1589, 1590–1605)
George III, King (1605–1639)
Alexander III, King (1639–1660)
Bagrat V, King (1660–1661, 1663–1668, 1669–1678, 1679–1681)
Vakhtang Tchutchunashvili, King (1661–1663)
Archil, King (1661–63, 1678–79, 1690–91, 1695–96, 1698)
Demetre, King (1663–1664)
George III of Guria, King (1681–1683)
Alexander IV, King (1683–1690, 1691–1695)
George V, King (1696–1698)
Simon, King (1699–1701)

Kingdom of Kakheti (complete list) –
Alexander II (Ottoman vassal after 1578), King (1574–1602, 1602–1605)
David I, King (1602)
Alexander II (restored), King (1602–1605)
Constantine I, King (1605)
Teimuraz I, King (1605–1614, 1615, 1625–1633, 1634–1648)
direct Persian rule (1614–1615, 1616–1625, 1633, 1648–1664, 1676–1703)
Archil, King (1664–1675)
Heraclius I, King (1675–1676)

Kingdom of Kartli (complete list) –
George X, King (1599–1606)
Luarsab II, King (1606–1615)
Bagrat VII, King (1615/16–1619)
Simon II, rival King (1619–1630/31)
Teimuraz I, rival King (1625–1633)
Rostom, King (1633–1658)
Vakhtang V, King (1658–1675)
George XI, King (1676–1688, 1703–1709)
Heraclius I, King (1688–1703)

Russia: Dagestan

Gazikumukh Khanate (complete list) –
Surkhay ibn Garai-Bek, Khan (1700–1741)
Murtazali ibn Surkhay, Khan (1741–1743)
Muhammad ibn Surkhay, Khan (1743–1789)
Surkhay ibn Muhammad, Khan (1789–1820)

Oceania

Chile: Easter Island

Easter Island (complete list) –
Marama Ariki, King (c.1600)
Riu Tupa Hotu (Nui Tupa Hotu?), King (?)
Toko Te Rangi, King (?)
Kao Aroaro (Re Kauu?), King (?)
Mataivi, King (?)
Kao Hoto, King (?)

French Polynesia

Uvea (complete list) –
Takumasiva, King (17th century)
Pou, King (17th century)
Tuakalau, King (17th century)
Eiki, King (17th century)
Tuiuvea, King (17th century)
Lilo-kaivale, King (17th century)

Tonga

Tuʻi Tonga Empire (complete list) –
Moʻunga ʻo Tonga, King (?)
Fotofili, King (fl.1643)
Vaea, King (?)
Moeakiola, King (?)
Tatafu, King (?)

United States: Hawaii

Island of Hawaiʻi (complete list) –
Kaikilani, supreme high chief (female) (1575–1605)
Keakealanikane, Aliʻi Aimoku (1605–1635)
Keakamāhana, supreme high chief (female) (1635–1665)
Keakealaniwahine, supreme high chief (female) (1665–1695)
Keaweʻīkekahialiʻiokamoku, co-ruler with his half-sister wife Kalanikauleleiaiwi (1695–1725)

Kauai (complete list) –
Kawelo a Maihunaliʻi, usurper King (c.1640–1650)

See also
List of governors of dependent territories in the 17th century
List of state leaders in the 17th-century Holy Roman Empire
List of state leaders in 17th-century South Asia

References 

17th century
 
-